Paddock of Love is the second album by Australian noise rock band Lubricated Goat, released in July 1988 by Black Eye Records.

Track listing

Personnel
Adapted from the Paddock of Love liner notes.

Lubricated Goat
Brett Ford – drums, harmonica, backing vocals
Pete Hartley – guitar, backing vocals
Guy Maddison – bass guitar, backing vocals
Stu Spasm – lead vocals, guitar, piano, synthesizer, percussion, production, bass guitar (2)

Additional musicians
Nick Barker – bass guitar (3, 4, 11, 12)
Ron Hadley – backing vocals
Adrian Hornblower – saxophone (3, 12)
Jody – backing vocals
Lachlan McCleod – backing vocals
Production and additional personnel
Dave Boyne – engineering (1-5, 10-12)
Tim Ryan – engineering (6-9)

Release history

References

External links 
 

1987 debut albums
Lubricated Goat albums
Amphetamine Reptile Records albums